A worksheet, in the word's original meaning,  is a sheet of paper on which one performs work. They come in many forms, most commonly associated with children's school work assignments, tax forms, and accounting or other business environments. Software is increasingly taking over the paper-based worksheet.

It can be a printed page that a child completes with a writing instrument.  No other materials are needed. It is "a sheet of paper on which work schedules, working time, special instructions, etc. are recorded. A piece or scrap of paper on which problems, ideas, or the like, are set down in tentative form." In education, a worksheet may have questions for students and places to record answers.

In accounting, a worksheet is, or was, a sheet of ruled paper with rows and columns on which an accountant could record information or perform calculations. These are often called columnar pads, and typically green-tinted.

In computing, spreadsheet software presents, on a computer monitor, a user interface that resembles one or more paper accounting worksheets. Microsoft Excel, a popular spreadsheet program, refers to a single spreadsheet (more technically, a two-dimensional matrix or array) as a worksheet, and it refers to a collection of worksheets as a workbook.

Education 

In the classroom setting, worksheets usually refer to a loose sheet of paper with questions or exercises for students to complete and record answers. They are used, to some degree, in most subjects, and have widespread use in the math curriculum where there are two major types. The first type of math worksheet contains a collection of similar math problems or exercises. These are intended to help a student become proficient in a particular mathematical skill that was taught to them in class. They are commonly given to students as homework. The second type of math worksheet is intended to introduce new topics, and are often completed in the classroom. They are made up of a progressive set of questions that leads to an understanding of the topic to be learned.

Worksheets are important because those are individual activities and parents also need it. They (parents) get to know what the child is doing in the school. With evolving curricula, parents may not have the necessary education to guide their students through homework or provide additional support at home. Having a worksheet template easily accessible can help with furthering learning at home.

Overall, research in early childhood education shows that worksheets are recommended mainly for assessment purposes. Worksheets should not be used for teaching as this is not developmentally appropriate for the education of young students.

As an assessment tool, worksheets can be used by teachers to understand students’ previous knowledge, outcome of learning, and the process of learning; at the same time, they can be used to enable students to monitor the progress of their own learning.

Worksheet generators are often used to develop the type of worksheets that contain a collection of similar problems.  A worksheet generator is a software program that quickly generates a collection of problems, particularly in mathematics or numeracy. Such software is often used by teachers to make classroom materials and tests. Worksheet generators may be loaded on local computers or accessed via a website. There are also many worksheet generators that are available online. However, original worksheets can be made on applications such as word or powerpoint.

Accounting 

In accounting, a worksheet often refers to a loose leaf piece of stationery from a columnar pad, as opposed to one that has been bound into a physical ledger book. From this, the term was extended to designate a single, two-dimensional array of data within a computerized spreadsheet program. Common types of worksheets used in business include financial statements, such as profit and loss reports. Analysts, investors, and accountants track a company's financial statements, balance sheets, and other data on worksheets.

In spreadsheet programs like the open source LibreOffice Calc or Microsoft's Excel, a single document is known as a 'workbook' and may have by default three arrays or 'worksheets'. One advantage of such programs is that they can contain formulae so that if one cell value is changed, the entire document is automatically updated, based on those formulae.

Taxes 
Many tax forms require complex calculations and table references to calculate a key value, or may require supplemental information that is only relevant in some cases. Rather than incorporating the calculations into the main form, they are often offloaded on a separate worksheet. The worksheet may be incorporated into the filing package, or may only be a tool for the filer to figure out the value, but without requiring the worksheet to be filed.

As an example, in the United States, income tax is withheld from the payments made by employers to employees. If taxes are significantly underwithheld, there is a penalty to the employee at the end of the year, and if they are overwitheld, the employee gets a refund for the overpayment of taxes. There is a basic formula for estimating the taxes that need to be paid, but various tax factors may cause it to be wrong, such as dependents, tax deductions, or income from other sources.

The W-4 form allows the employee to pick an exemption level to reduce the tax factoring (to avoid overpayment), or specify an extra amount above the standard number (to avoid underpayment). The form comes with two worksheets, one to calculate exemptions, and another to calculate the effects of other income (second job, spouse's job). The bottom number in each worksheet is used to fill out two if the lines in the main W4 form. The main form is filed with the employer, and the worksheets are discarded or held by the employee.

References 

Stationery
Mathematics education
Accounting systems